Zimrin (transliteration: Zimrīn, also spelled Zamrin) is a village in southern Syria, administratively part of the al-Sanamayn District of the Daraa Governorate. Nearby localities include Qayta and al-Sanamayn to the east, Samlin and Inkhil to the southeast, Jasim to the south, Nimer to the southwest, al-Harra to the west, Aqraba to the northwest and Kafr Shams to the northeast. In the 2004 census by the Central Bureau of Statistics (CBS), Zimrin had a population of 2,048.

History

Ottoman era
In 1596 Zimrin appeared in the Ottoman tax registers, situated in the nahiya of Jaydur, part of Hauran Sanjak. It had an entirely  Muslim population consisting  of 16 households and 15 bachelors. They paid a fixed tax-rate of 25% on agricultural products, including wheat, barley, summer crops, goats and beehives; in addition to occasional revenues; a total of 2,750 akçe.

In 1897, the German archaeologist Gottlieb Schumacher noted that Zimrin had a population of 300 people living in 60 homes and that the village contained ruins. In the preceding years, some of Zimrin's peasants joined others from Jasim to resettle the village of al-Harra at the foot of the nearby Tell al-Hara hill.

References

Bibliography

External links
 Sanameine-map, 19L

Populated places in Al-Sanamayn District
Villages in Syria